Artem Zhurko (born 8 April 2003) is a Belarusian professional footballer who plays for Energetik-BGU Minsk.

References

External links 
 
 

2003 births
Living people
Belarusian footballers
Association football midfielders
FC Energetik-BGU Minsk players